In mathematics, a rational variety is an algebraic variety, over a given field K, which is birationally equivalent to a projective space of some dimension over K. This means that its function field is isomorphic to

the field of all rational functions for some set  of indeterminates, where d is the dimension of the variety.

Rationality and parameterization

Conversely, such a rational parameterization induces a field homomorphism of the field of functions of V into . But this homomorphism is not necessarily onto. If such a parameterization exists, the variety is said to be unirational. Lüroth's theorem (see below) implies that unirational curves are rational.  Castelnuovo's theorem implies also that, in characteristic zero, every unirational surface is rational.

Rationality questions
A rationality question asks whether a given field extension is rational, in the sense of being (up to isomorphism) the function field of a rational variety; such field extensions are also described as purely transcendental.

For example, let  be a field, and let

be indeterminates over K and let L be the field generated over K by them.
In the paper  on Galois theory she studied the problem of parameterizing the equations with given Galois group, which she reduced  to "Noether's problem". (She first mentioned this problem in  where she attributed the problem to E. Fischer.) She showed this was true for n = 2, 3, or 4.  found a counter-example to the Noether's problem, with n = 47 and G a cyclic group of order 47.

Lüroth's theorem

A celebrated case is Lüroth's problem, which Jacob Lüroth solved in the nineteenth century. Lüroth's problem concerns subextensions L of K(X), the rational functions in the single indeterminate X. Any such field is either equal to K or is also rational, i.e. L = K(F) for some rational function F. In geometrical terms this states that a non-constant rational map from the projective line to a curve C can only occur when C also has genus 0. That fact can be read off geometrically from the Riemann–Hurwitz formula.

Even though Lüroth's theorem is often thought as a non elementary result, several elementary short proofs have been discovered for long. These simple proofs use only  the basics of field theory and Gauss's lemma for primitive polynomials (see e.g.).

Unirationality

A unirational variety V over a field K is one dominated by a rational variety, so that its function field K(V) lies in a pure transcendental field of finite type (which can be chosen to be of finite degree over K(V) if K is infinite). The solution of Lüroth's problem shows that for algebraic curves, rational and unirational are the same, and Castelnuovo's theorem implies that for complex surfaces  unirational implies rational, because both are characterized by the vanishing of both the arithmetic genus and the second plurigenus. Zariski found some examples (Zariski surfaces) in characteristic p > 0 that are unirational but not rational.   showed  that a cubic three-fold is in general not a rational variety, providing an example for three dimensions that unirationality does not imply rationality. Their work used an intermediate Jacobian. 
 showed that all non-singular quartic threefolds are irrational, though some of them are unirational.  found some unirational 3-folds with non-trivial torsion in their third cohomology group, which implies that they are not rational.

For any field K, János Kollár proved in 2000 that a smooth cubic hypersurface of dimension at least 2 is unirational if it has a point defined over K. This is an improvement of many classical results, beginning with the case of cubic surfaces (which are rational varieties over an algebraic closure). Other examples of varieties that are shown to be unirational are many cases of the moduli space of curves.

Rationally connected variety 
A rationally connected variety (or uniruled variety) V is a projective algebraic variety over an algebraically closed field such that through every two points there passes the image of a regular map from the projective line into V. Equivalently, a variety is rationally connected if every two points are connected by a rational curve contained in the variety.

This definition differs form that of path connectedness only by the nature of the path, but is very different, as the only algebraic curves which are rationally connected are the rational ones.

Every rational variety, including the projective spaces, is rationally connected, but the converse is false. The class of the rationally connected varieties is thus a generalization of the class of the rational varieties.  Unirational varieties are rationally connected, but it is not known if the converse holds.

Stably rational varieties

Any rational variety is thus, by definition, stably rational. Examples constructed by  show, that the converse is false however.

 showed that very general hypersurfaces  are not stably rational, provided that the degree of V is at least .

See also

 Rational curve
Rational surface
Severi–Brauer variety
Birational geometry

Notes

References

.
.

Field (mathematics)
Algebraic varieties
Birational geometry